Brian Lashoff (born July 16, 1990) is an American professional ice hockey defenseman  currently playing as captain for the Grand Rapids Griffins in the American Hockey League (AHL). He has previously played with the Detroit Red Wings of the National Hockey League (NHL).

Playing career
As a youth, Lashoff played in the 2003 Quebec International Pee-Wee Hockey Tournament with the New York Rangers minor ice hockey team.

Undrafted, Lashoff played major junior hockey in the Ontario Hockey League with the Barrie Colts and Kingston Frontenacs. On October 1, 2008 he was signed to an entry-level contract with the Detroit Red Wings organization following their 2008 training camp.

At the beginning of the lockout shortened 2012–13 season, Lashoff was recalled by the Red Wings after an injury to Jonathan Ericsson on January 21, 2013.
He made his NHL debut the same day against the Columbus Blue Jackets, and scored his first goal in the second period against Sergei Bobrovsky.

On May 11, 2013, after being sent down from Detroit, Lashoff returned to the Grand Rapids Griffins to help them during their 2013 Calder Cup run. During the 2012–13 season, Lashoff recorded two goals and four assists in 37 regular season games, and one assist in 18 postseason games.

On January 30, 2015, Lashoff was placed on waivers by the Red Wings. After clearing waivers, Lashoff was assigned to the Grand Rapids Griffins. Prior to being placed on waivers, Lashoff appeared in 11 games for the Red Wings during the 2014–15 season, where he recorded two assists.

On June 16, 2016, the Red Wings signed Lashoff to a one-year contract extension. During the 2016–17 season, Lashoff recorded three goals and eights assists in 62 games during the regular season. During the 2017 Calder Cup playoffs, he recorded one goal and three assists in 17 playoffs games, and helped lead the Griffins to the Calder Cup.

On June 29, 2017, the Red Wings signed Lashoff to a two-year contract extension. On December 6, 2018, Lashoff was recalled by the Red Wings. Prior to being recalled, he recorded three assists in 17 games for the Griffins. On March 13, 2019, the Red Wings signed Lashoff to a two-year contract extension.

On December 27, 2019, the Red Wings recalled Lashoff from the Griffins. Prior to being recalled, he recorded two goals and 12 assists in 25 games for the Griffins.

On February 4, 2021, entering his twelfth year in the AHL, Lashoff was named the 17th captain in franchise history of the Grand Rapids Griffins before the commencement of the pandemic delayed 2020–21 season. Approaching the NHL trade deadline, Lashoff was involved in a three-way trade being initially dealt by the Red Wings to the Columbus Blue Jackets in exchange for David Savard before he was flipped to the Tampa Bay Lightning in exchange for a 2021 first-round pick and a 2022 third-round pick on April 10, 2021. He was assigned to the Grand Rapids Griffins by the Lightning to continue his tenure as captain.

On July 30, 2021, the Red Wings signed Lashoff to a one-year contract. In the 2021–22 season, Lashoff played exclusively with the Griffins, posting 5 goals and 16 points through 67 games.

As the Griffins longest ever tenured player, Lashoff was signed to return for a 14th season with the club, signing a one-year AHL contract on May 25, 2022.

International play

Lashoff represented the United States at the 2010 World Junior Ice Hockey Championships where he recorded two assists in seven games, and won a gold medal.

Personal
Brian's older brother, Matt, has also played professionally in the NHL and currently plays for the SCL Tigers of the National League A. Their first game played against each other in an organized league was December 22, 2010 when the Grand Rapids Griffins met the Toronto Marlies in an AHL game.

Career statistics

Regular season and playoffs

International

Awards and honors

References

External links

1990 births
Living people
American men's ice hockey defensemen
Barrie Colts players
Detroit Red Wings players
Grand Rapids Griffins players
Ice hockey players from New York (state)
Kingston Frontenacs players
Sportspeople from Albany, New York
Toledo Walleye players
Undrafted National Hockey League players